The 2015 Kansas City Royals season was the 47th for the franchise, and their 43rd at Kauffman Stadium.  The Royals made their second consecutive World Series appearance in 2015, after winning the American League in 2014. They won the series for the first time since 1985. The team won their first AL Central title on September 24, 2015, the first time the Royals won their division since 1985. They opened the playoffs by defeating the Houston Astros in five games in the Division Series and then defeated the Toronto Blue Jays in six games in the American League Championship Series. They defeated the New York Mets in five games in the 2015 World Series, the second World Series championship in franchise history. The 2015 Royals are the first team since the 1989 Oakland Athletics to win the World Series after having lost the series in the previous season.

Offseason

October 30: Josh Willingham, James Shields, Raúl Ibañez, Luke Hochevar, Jason Frasor, Scott Downs, and Norichika Aoki become free agents.
 Hochevar and Frasor re-signed with the Royals.
 Downs signed with the Cleveland Indians.
 Aoki signed with the San Francisco Giants.
 Shields signed with the San Diego Padres.
 Willingham retired at age 34.
 Ibañez retired at age 42.

November 1: Billy Butler becomes a free agent. He would sign with the Oakland Athletics.

November 3: Promoted Paulo Orlando.

Week of November 5: Signed 4 players to a minor league contract, and invited 2 of them to spring training.

November 20: Received Reymond Fuentes from the San Diego Padres for Kyle Bartsch and promoted 2 other players.

November 24: Jayson Nix becomes a free agent while Juan Flores signs a minor league contract.

November 26: Received Ryan Jackson from the Los Angeles Dodgers for cash.
 Jackson would be sent to the minors.

November 28: Received Bryan Flynn and Reid Redman from the Miami Marlins for Aaron Crow. Signed Jason Frasor and also gave Ismaldo Rodriguez to a minor league contract.

December 2: Francisley Bueno becomes a free agent as Dany Geraldo signs a minor league contract.

December 8: Signed Gabriel Noriega to a minor league contract and invited him to spring training.

December 11: Received Jandel Gustave from the Boston Red Sox for cash.

December 14: Signed Angel Franco to a minor league contract.

Week of December 15:
 Signed 3 players to a minor league contract.
 Sent 3 players to the minors.
 Released Carlos Peguero.
 Signed Kendrys Morales, Alex Ríos, Kris Medlen, and Yohan Pino.
 Received Brian Broderick from the Los Angeles Angels for Johnny Giavotella.

December 28: Signed 3 players to a minor league contract.

December 29: Signed Edinson Vólquez.

January 4: Signed Ryan Madson to a minor league contract and invited him to spring training.

January 16: Signed 2 players to a minor league contract and invited them to spring training.

January 26: Invited 16 players to spring training and signed J. C. Boscán to a minor league contract and also invited him to spring training. Brian Bocock also signs a minor league contract.

Season standings

American League Central

American League Wild Card

Record against opponents

Detailed records

Game log

|-bgcolor="bbffbb"
| 1 || April 6 || White Sox || 10–1 || Ventura (1–0) || Samardzija (0–1)  || — || 40,085 || 1–0
|- bgcolor="bbffbb"
| 2 || April 8 || White Sox || 7–5 || Davis (1–0) || Putnam (0–1) || Holland (1) || 23,385 || 2–0
|- bgcolor="bbffbb"
| 3 || April 9 || White Sox || 4–1 || Vólquez (1–0) || Danks (0–1) || Holland (2) || 20,236 || 3–0
|- bgcolor="bbffbb"
| 4 || April 10 || @ Angels || 4–2 || Vargas (1–0) || Santiago (0–1) || Davis (1) || 44,489 || 4–0
|- bgcolor="bbffbb"
| 5 || April 11 || @ Angels || 6–4 || Guthrie (1–0) || Weaver (0–2) || Holland (3) || 44,154 || 5–0
|- bgcolor="bbffbb"
| 6 || April 12 || @ Angels || 9–2 || Ventura (2–0) || Wilson (1–1) || — || 37,060 || 6–0
|- bgcolor="bbffbb"
| 7 || April 13 || @ Twins || 12–3 || Duffy (1–0) || May (0–1) || — || 40,123 || 7–0
|- bgcolor="ffbbbb"
| 8 || April 15 || @ Twins || 1–3 || Gibson (1–1) || Vólquez (1–1) || Perkins (1) || 21,362 || 7–1
|- bgcolor="ffbbbb"
| 9 || April 16 || @ Twins || 5–8 || Milone (2–0) || Vargas (1–1) || Perkins (2) || 17,449 || 7–2
|- bgcolor="bbffbb"
| 10 || April 17 || Athletics || 6–4 || Davis (2–0) || Otero (0–1) || Holland (4) || 39,228 || 8–2
|- bgcolor="ffbbbb"
| 11 || April 18 || Athletics || 0–5 || Hahn (1–1) || Ventura (2–1) || Chavez (1) || 33,151 || 8–3
|- bgcolor="bbffbb"
| 12 || April 19 || Athletics || 4–2 || Morales (1–0) || O'Flaherty (0–1) || Davis (2) || 36,755 || 9–3
|- bgcolor="bbffbb"
| 13 || April 20 || Twins || 7–1 || Vólquez (2–1) || Gibson (1–2) || — || 20,393 || 10–3
|- bgcolor="bbffbb"
| 14 || April 21 || Twins || 6–5 || Young (1–0) || Fien (0–1) || Davis (3) || 20,990 || 11–3
|- bgcolor="ffbbbb"
| 15 || April 22 || Twins || 0–3 || Pelfrey (1–0) || Guthrie (1–1) || Perkins (3) || 24,721 || 11–4
|- bgcolor="bbffbb"
| 16 || April 23 || @ White Sox || 3–2 (13) || Morales (2–0) || Petricka (0–1) || Davis (4) || 14,218 || 12–4
|- bgcolor="bbbbbb"
| — || April 24 || @ White Sox || 2–2 (8) || colspan="3" |  *Suspended (rain) (Resumed: April 26) || 20,350 || 12–4
|- bgcolor="bbbbbb"
| — || April 25 || @ White Sox || colspan="6" |  Postponed (rain) (Resceduled: July 17)
|- bgcolor="ffbbbb"
| 17 || April 26 || @ White Sox || 2–3* || Robertson (2–0) || Herrera (0–1) || — || 20,350 || 12–5 
|- bgcolor="ffbbbb"
| 18 || April 26 || @ White Sox || 3–5 || Danks (1–2) || Vólquez (2–2) || Robertson (3) || 23,317 || 12–6
|- bgcolor="bbffbb"
| 19 || April 27 || @ Indians || 6–2 || Vargas (2–1) || Kluber (0–3) || — || 9,668 || 13–6
|- bgcolor="bbffbb"
| 20 || April 28 || @ Indians || 11–5 || Finnegan (1–0) || Atchison (0–1) || — || 10,698 || 14–6
|- bgcolor="ffbbbb"
| 21 || April 29 || @ Indians || 5–7 || Salazar (3–0) || Ventura (2–2) || Allen (4) || 10,284 || 14–7
|- bgcolor="bbffbb"
| 22 || April 30 || Tigers || 8–1 || Duffy (2–0) || Simón (4–1) || — || 28,405 || 15–7
|-

|- bgcolor="bbffbb"
| 23 || May 1 || Tigers || 4–1 || Young (2–0) || Lobstein (2–2) || Davis (5) || 38,186 || 16–7
|- bgcolor="ffbbbb"
| 24 || May 2 || Tigers || 1–2 || Price (3–1) || Vólquez (2–3) || — || 38,692 || 16–8
|- bgcolor="ffbbbb"
| 25 || May 3 || Tigers || 4–6 || Sánchez (2–3) || Guthrie (1–2) || Soria (10) || 38,326 || 16–9
|- bgcolor="bbffbb"
| 26 || May 5 || Indians || 5–3 || Vargas (3–1) || Salazar (3–1) ||Davis (6) || 29,099 || 17–9
|- bgcolor="ffbbbb"
| 27 || May 6 || Indians || 3–10 || Carrasco (4–2) || Duffy (2–1) || — || 23,316 || 17–10
|- bgcolor="bbffbb"
| 28 || May 7 || Indians || 7–4 || Morales (3–0) || Kluber (0–5) || Holland (5) || 38,271 || 18–10
|- bgcolor="ffbbbb"
| 29 || May 8 || @ Tigers || 5–6 || Soria (2–0) || Pino (0–1) || — || 39,434 || 18–11
|- bgcolor="bbffbb"
| 30 || May 9 || @ Tigers || 6–2 || Guthrie (2–2) || Sánchez (2–4) ||  || 41,456 || 19–11
|- bgcolor="bbffbb"
| 31 || May 10 || @ Tigers || 2–1 || Frasor (1–0) || Nesbitt (0–1) || Holland (6) || 29,852 || 20–11
|- bgcolor="ffbbbb"
| 32 || May 11 || @ Rangers || 2–8 || Lewis (3–2) || Duffy (2–2) || — || 21,206 || 20–12
|- bgcolor="bbffbb"
| 33 || May 12 || @ Rangers || 7–6 (10) || Holland (1–0) || Pimentel (0–1) || — || 23,659 || 21–12
|- bgcolor="ffbbbb"
| 34 || May 13 || @ Rangers || 2–5 || Gallardo (3–5) || Ventura (2–3) || Feliz (6) || 26,258 || 21–13
|- bgcolor="bbffbb"
| 35 || May 14 || @ Rangers || 6–3 || Guthrie (3–2) || Detwiler (0–5) || Holland (7) || 33,818 || 22–13
|- bgcolor="bbffbb"
| 36 || May 15 || Yankees || 12–1 || Young (3–0) || Pineda (5–1) || — || 34,584 || 23–13
|- bgcolor="ffbbbb"
| 37 || May 16 || Yankees || 1–5 || Sabathia (2–5) || Duffy (2–3) || — || 31,871 || 23–14
|- bgcolor="bbffbb"
| 38 || May 17 || Yankees || 6–0 || Vólquez (3–3) || Capuano (0–1) || — || 31,251 || 24–14
|- bgcolor="bbffbb"
| 39 || May 19 || Reds || 3–0 || Ventura (3–3) || Cueto (3–4) || Davis (7) || 29,767 || 25–14
|- bgcolor="bbffbb"
| 40 || May 20 || Reds || 7–1 || Guthrie (4–2) || Marquis (3–4) || — || 30,450 || 26–14
|- bgcolor="bbffbb"
| 41 || May 22 || Cardinals || 5–0 || Young (4–0) || Lynn (3–4) || — || 37,379 || 27–14
|- bgcolor="bbffbb"
| 42 || May 23 || Cardinals || 3–2 (6) || Vólquez (4–3) || Lackey (2–3) || — || 38,676 || 28–14
|- bgcolor="ffbbbb"
| 43 || May 24 || Cardinals || 1–6 || Wacha (7–0) || Ventura (3–4) || — || 36,342 || 28–15
|- bgcolor="ffbbbb"
| 44 || May 25 || @ Yankees || 1–14 || Eovaldi (4–1) || Guthrie (4–3) || — || 36,031 || 28–16
|- bgcolor="ffbbbb"
| 45 || May 26 || @ Yankees || 1–5 || Warren (3–3) || Vargas (3–2) || — || 33,414 || 28–17
|- bgcolor="ffbbbb"
| 46 || May 27 || @ Yankees || 2–4 || Pineda (6–2) || Young (4–1) || Miller (14) || 32,734 || 28–18
|- bgcolor="bbffbb"
| 47 || May 29 || @ Cubs || 8–4 || Herrera (1–1) || Strop (1–3) || — || 34,273 || 29–18
|- bgcolor="bbbbbb"
| || May 30 || @ Cubs ||colspan="6" | Postponed (rain): Makeup date on September 28
|- bgcolor="ffbbbb"
| 48 || May 31 || @ Cubs || 1–2 (11) || Rosscup (2–1) || Madson (0–1) || — || 37,766 || 29–19
|-

|- bgcolor="ffbbbb"
| 49 || June 2 || Indians || 1–2 || Carrasco (7–4) || Davis (2–1) || Allen (12) || 30,361 || 29–20
|- bgcolor="bbffbb"
| 50 || June 3 || Indians || 4–2 || Vargas (4–2) || Kluber (3–6) || Holland (8) || 29,899 || 30–20
|- bgcolor="ffbbbb"
| 51 || June 4 || Indians || 2–6 (8) || Bauer (5–2) || Young (4–2) || — || 29,552 || 30–21
|- bgcolor="ffbbbb"
| 52 || June 5 || Rangers || 0–4 || Gonzalez (2–0) || Vólquez (4–4) || — || 38,159 || 30–22
|- bgcolor="ffbbbb"
| 53 || June 6 || Rangers || 2–4 || Rodríguez (3–2) || Ventura (3–5) || Tolleson (7) || 37,924 || 30–23
|- bgcolor="bbffbb"
| 54 || June 7 || Rangers || 4–3 || Davis (3–1) || Kela (4–2) || Holland (9) || 38,202 || 31–23
|- bgcolor="bbffbb"
| 55 || June 8 || @ Twins || 3–1 || Vargas (5–2) || Hughes (4–6) || Holland (10) || 22,796 || 32–23
|- bgcolor="bbffbb"
| 56 || June 9 || @ Twins || 2–0 || Young (5–2) || May (4–4) || Holland (11) || 22,497 || 33–23
|- bgcolor="bbffbb"
| 57 || June 10 || @ Twins || 7–2 || Vólquez (5–4) || Gibson (4–4) || — || 28,434 || 34–23
|- bgcolor="ffbbbb"
| 58 || June 12 || @ Cardinals || 0–4 || García (2-3) || Ventura (3–6) || — || 45,909 || 34–24
|- bgcolor="ffbbbb"
| 59 || June 13 || @ Cardinals || 3–2 || Lyons (1–0) || Guthrie (4–4) || Rosenthal (21) || 45,981 || 34–25
|- bgcolor="bbbbbb"
| 60 || June 14 || @ Cardinals ||colspan="6" | Postponed (rain): Rescheduled July 23
|- bgcolor="bbffbb"
| 61 || June 15 || @ Brewers || 8–5 || Vólquez (6–4) || Lohse (3–8) || Davis (8) || 23,007 || 35–25
|- bgcolor="bbffbb"
| 62 || June 16 || @ Brewers || 7–2 || Young (6–2) || Garza (4–8) || – || 27,740 || 36–25
|- bgcolor="bbffbb"
| 63 || June 17 || Brewers || 10–2 || Blanton (1–0) || Fiers (3–7) || – || 33,420 || 37–25
|- bgcolor="bbffbb"
| 64 || June 18 || Brewers || 3–2 || Guthrie (5–4) || Nelson (3–8) || Holland (12) || 36,318 || 38–25
|- bgcolor="ffbbbb"
| 65 || June 19 || Red Sox || 3–7 || Rodríguez (3-1) || Pino (0-2) || — || 38,190 || 38–26
|- bgcolor="bbffbb"
| 66 || June 20 || Red Sox || 7–4 || Vólquez (7-4) || Porcello (4-8) || Holland (13) || 39,115 || 39–26
|- bgcolor="ffbbbb"
| 67 || June 21 || Red Sox || 2–13 || Miley (7–6) || Young (6–3) || — || 37,975 || 39–27
|- bgcolor="bbffbb"
| 68 || June 22 || @ Mariners || 4–1 || Blanton (2–0) || Hernández (10–4) || Holland (14) || 23,588 || 40–27
|- bgcolor="ffbbbb"
| 69 || June 23 || @ Mariners || 0–7 || Montgomery (2–2) || Guthrie (5–5) ||  || 17,460 || 40–28
|- bgcolor="bbffbb"
| 70 || June 24 || @ Mariners || 8–2 || Madson (1–1) || Elias (4–5) || — || 23,392 || 41–28
|- bgcolor="bbffbb"
| 71 || June 26 || @ Athletics || 5–2 || Vólquez (8–4) || Hahn (5–6) || Holland (15) || 27,365 || 42–28
|- bgcolor="bbffbb"
| 72 || June 27 || @ Athletics || 3–2 || Young (7–3) || Kazmir (4–5) || Holland (16) || 28,619 || 43–28
|- bgcolor="bbffbb"
| 73 || June 28 || @ Athletics || 5–3 || Guthrie (6–5) || Chavez (4–7) || Davis (9) || 22,477 || 44–28
|- bgcolor="ffbbbb"
| 74 || June 29 || @ Astros || 1–6 || McCullers (4–2) || Blanton (2–1) || – || 20,419 || 44–29
|- bgcolor="ffbbbb"
| 75 || June 30 || @ Astros || 0–4 || Keuchel (10–3) || Duffy (2–4) || — || 24,642 || 44–30
|-

|- bgcolor="ffbbbb"
| 76 || July 1 || @ Astros || 5–6 || Gregerson (3–1) || Herrera (1–2) || — || 25,848 || 44–31
|- bgcolor="ffbbbb"
| 77 || July 2 || Twins || 0–2 || Gibson (6–6) || Young (7–4) || Perkins (26) || 37,196 || 44–32
|- bgcolor="bbffbb"
| 78 || July 3 || Twins || 3–2 || Davis (4–1) || Thompson (1–3) || — || 38,868 || 45–32
|- bgcolor="ffbbbb"
| 79 || July 4 || Twins || 3–5 || Duensing (3–0) || Blanton (2–2) || Perkins (27) || 37,917 || 45–33
|- bgcolor="bbffbb"
| 80 || July 5 || Twins || 3–2 || Holland (2–0) || Boyer (2–4) || — || 29,427 || 46–33
|- bgcolor="bbbbbb"
| – || July 6 || Rays ||colspan="6" | Postponed (rain) to July 7 as part of a doubleheader.
|- bgcolor="bbffbb"
| 81 || July 7 || Rays || 9–5 || Holland (3–0) || Boxberger (4–5) || – || 22,386 || 47–33 
|- bgcolor="bbffbb"
| 82 || July 7 || Rays || 7–1 || Finnegan (2–0) || Gomes (1–4) || – || 28,119 || 48–33
|- bgcolor="bbffbb"
| 83 || July 8 || Rays || 9–7 || Guthrie (7–5) || Archer (9–6) || Holland (17) || 28,204 || 49–33
|- bgcolor="bbffbb"
| 84 || July 9 || Rays || 8–3 || Ventura (4–6) || Karns (4–5) ||  || 32,308 || 50–33
|- bgcolor="bbffbb"
| 85 || July 10 || Blue Jays || 3–0 || Duffy (3–4) || Estrada (6–5) || Holland (18) || 31,558 || 51–33
|- bgcolor="ffbbbb"
| 86 || July 11 || Blue Jays || 2–6 || Buehrle (10–5) || Young (7–5) || — || 30,790 || 51–34
|- bgcolor="bbffbb"
| 87 || July 12 || Blue Jays || 11–10 || Davis (5–1) || Schultz (0–1) || Holland (19) || 31,962 || 52–34
|- bgcolor=#ddd
| – || July 14 || 86th All-Star Game || AL 6–3 NL || Price (AL, DET) || Kershaw (NL, LAD) || colspan=3 | National League vs. American League (Great American Ball Park,Cincinnati)
|- bgcolor="bbffbb"
| 88 || July 17 || @ White Sox || 4–2 || Young (8–5) || Samardzija (6–5) || Holland (20) || 25,807 || 53–34 
|- bgcolor="ffbbbb"
| 89 || July 17 || @ White Sox || 0–2 || Danks (5–8) || Vólquez (8–5) || Robertson (20) || 25,701 || 53–35
|- bgcolor="bbffbb"
| 90 || July 18 || @ White Sox || 7–6 (13) || Finnegan (3–0) || Jennings (1–3) || Madson (1) || 33,559 || 54–35
|- bgcolor="bbffbb"
| 91 || July 19 || @ White Sox || 4–1 || Duffy (4–4) || Sale (8–5) || Blanton (1) || 32,175 || 55–35
|- bgcolor="ffbbbb"
| 92 || July 20 || Pirates || 7–10 || Burnett (8–3) || Ventura (4–7) || Melancon (30) || 38,169 || 55–36
|- bgcolor="bbffbb"
| 93 || July 21 || Pirates || 3–1 || Davis (6–1) || Cole (13–4) || Holland (21) || 38,163 || 56–36
|- bgcolor="bbffbb"
| 94 || July 22 || Pirates || 5–1 || Vólquez (9–5)  || Morton (6–4)  || — || 39,105 || 57–36
|- bgcolor="ffbbbb"
| 95 || July 23|| @ Cardinals || 3–4 || Lackey (9–5)  ||  Young (8–6)  || Rosenthal (30) || 46,003 || 57–37
|- bgcolor="ffbbbb"
| 96 || July 24 || Astros || 0–4 || Kazmir (6–5)  || Guthrie (7–6)  || Gregerson (21)  || 36,965 || 57–38
|- bgcolor="bbffbb"
| 97 || July 25 || Astros || 2–1 (10) || Herrera (2–2) || Harris (4–2) || — || 38,893 || 58–38
|- bgcolor="bbffbb"
| 98 || July 26 || Astros || 5–1 || Ventura (5–7) || Keuchel (12–5) || — || 33,638 || 59–38
|- bgcolor="bbffbb"
| 99 || July 27 || @ Indians || 9–4 || Vólquez (10–5) || Anderson (2–2)  || Blanton (2) || 13,611 || 60–38
|- bgcolor="bbffbb"
| 100 || July 28 || @ Indians || 2–1 || Davis (7–1) || Bauer (8–8) || Holland (22) || 18,064 || 61–38
|- bgcolor="ffbbbb"
| 101 || July 29 || @ Indians || 1–12 || Kluber (6–11) || Guthrie (7–7) || — || 19,767 || 61–39
|- bgcolor="ffbbbb"
| 102 || July 30 || @ Blue Jays || 2–5 || Estrada (8–6) || Duffy (4–5) || Osuna (6) || 30,057 || 61–40
|- bgcolor="ffbbbb"
| 103 || July 31 || @ Blue Jays || 6–7 || Hendriks (3–0) || Morales (3–1) || — || 29,389 || 61–41
|-

|- bgcolor="bbffbb"
| 104 || August 1 || @ Blue Jays || 7–6 || Ventura (6–7) || Lowe (0–2) || Holland (23) || 37,932  || 62–41
|- bgcolor="ffbbbb"
| 105 || August 2 || @ Blue Jays || 2–5 || Dickey (6–10) || Vólquez (10–6) || Osuna (7) || 45,736 || 62–42
|- bgcolor="bbffbb"
| 106 || August 4 || @ Tigers || 5–1 || Duffy (5–5) || Verlander (1–4) ||  || 35,039 || 63–42
|- bgcolor="ffbbbb"
| 107 || August 5 || @ Tigers || 1–2 || Boyd (1–2) || Cueto (7–7) || Wilson (2) || 34,628 || 63–43
|- bgcolor="ffbbbb"
| 108 || August 6 || @ Tigers || 6–8 || Wilson (2–3) || Madson (1–2) || — || 38,919 || 63–44
|- bgcolor="bbffbb"
| 109 || August 7 || White Sox || 3–2 || Vólquez (11–6) || Danks (6–9) || Holland (24) || 36,211 || 64–44
|- bgcolor="bbffbb"
| 110 || August 8 || White Sox || 7–6 || Guthrie (8–7) || Samardzija (8–7) || Holland (25) || 39,302 || 65–44
|- bgcolor="bbffbb"
| 111 || August 9 || White Sox || 5–4 || Herrera (3–2) || Petricka (3–3) || Madson (2) || 35,785 || 66–44
|- bgcolor="bbffbb"
| 112 || August 10 || Tigers || 4–0 || Cueto (8–7) || Boyd (1–3) ||  || 36,672 || 67–44
|- bgcolor="bbffbb"
| 113 || August 11 || Tigers || 6–1 || Ventura (7–7) || Sánchez (10–10) || Hochevar (1) || 34,068 || 68–44
|- bgcolor="ffbbbb"
| 114 || August 12 || Tigers || 4–7 || Feliz (2–3) || Vólquez (11–7) || Rondón (2) || 30,732 || 68–45
|- bgcolor="ffbbbb"
| 115 || August 13 || Angels || 6–7 || Álvarez (3–3) || Holland (3–1) || Street (27) || 32,098 || 68–46
|- bgcolor="bbffbb"
| 116 || August 14 || Angels || 4–1 || Duffy (6–5) || Weaver (4–9) || Holland (26) || 36,926 || 69–46
|- bgcolor="bbffbb"
| 117 || August 15 || Angels || 9–4 || Cueto (9–8) || Shoemaker (5–9) || — || 39,251 || 70–46
|- bgcolor="bbffbb"
| 118 || August 16 || Angels || 4–3 (10) || Herrera (4–2) || Gott (2–1) || — || 36,845 || 71–46
|- bgcolor="bbffbb"
| 119 || August 18 || @ Reds || 3–1 (13) || Medlen (1–0) || Mattheus (1–4) || Holland (27) || 28,719 || 72–46
|- bgcolor="bbffbb"
| 120 || August 19 || @ Reds || 4–3 || Hochevar (1–0) || Sampson (2–2) || Davis (10) || 18,078 || 73–46
|- bgcolor="ffbbbb"
| 121 || August 20 || @ Red Sox || 1–4 || Miley (10–9) || Duffy (6–6) || Tazawa (2) || 35,458 || 73–47 
|- bgcolor="ffbbbb"
| 122 || August 21 || @ Red Sox || 2–7 || Owens (2–1) || Cueto (9–8) ||  || 35,203 || 73–48
|- bgcolor="bbffbb"
| 123 || August 22 || @ Red Sox || 6–3 || Ventura (8–7) || Barnes (3–4) || Holland (28) ||   37,135 || 74–48
|- bgcolor="bbffbb"
| 124 || August 23 || @ Red Sox || 8–6 || Young (9–6) || Tazawa (2–6) || Davis (11) || 36,151 || 75–48
|- bgcolor="bbffbb"
| 125 || August 24 || Orioles || 8–3 || Medlen (2–0) || Jiménez (9–8) || — || 27,797 || 76–48
|- bgcolor="bbffbb"
| 126 || August 25 || Orioles || 3–2 || Duffy (7–6) || González (9–10) || Davis (12) || 29,734 || 77–48
|- bgcolor="ffbbbb"
| 127 || August 26 || Orioles || 5–8 || Chen (8–6) || Cueto (9–9) || Britton (30) || 33,003 || 77–49
|- bgcolor="bbffbb"
| 128 || August 27 || Orioles || 5–3 || Ventura (9–7)  || Tillman (9–9) || — || 31,155 || 78–49
|- bgcolor="bbffbb"
| 129 || August 28 || @ Rays || 3–2 || Vólquez (12–7) || Ramírez (10–5) || Holland (29) || 13,622 || 79–49
|- bgcolor="bbffbb"
| 130 || August 29 || @ Rays || 6–3 || Medlen (3–0) || Odorizzi (6–7) || Davis (13) || 24,372 || 80–49
|- bgcolor="ffbbbb"
| 131 || August 30 || @ Rays || 2–3 || Cedeño (3–1) || Hochevar (1–1) || Boxberger (32) || 18,634 || 80–50
|-

|- bgcolor="ffbbbb"
| 132 || September 1 || Tigers || 5–6 || Verlander (3–6) || Cueto (9–10) || Rondón (3) || 30,665 || 80–51
|- bgcolor="bbffbb"
| 133 || September 2 || Tigers || 12–1 || Ventura (10–7) || Wolf (0–3) || — || 26,789 || 81–51
|- bgcolor="bbffbb"
| 134 || September 3 || Tigers || 15–7 || Young (10–6) || Ryan (1–3) || — || 29,409 || 82–51
|- bgcolor="ffbbbb"
| 135 || September 4 || White Sox || 1–12 || Danks (7–12) || Medlen (3–1) || — || 36,953 || 82–52
|- bgcolor="ffbbbb"
| 136 || September 5 || White Sox ||1–6 ||Quintana (6–10)  || Duffy (7–7) || — || 37,287 || 82–53
|- bgcolor="ffbbbb"
| 137 || September 6 || White Sox ||5–7 || Johnson (1–0) || Cueto (9–11)  || — || 38,902 ||  82–54
|- bgcolor="ffbbbb"
| 138 || September 7 || Twins || 2–6 || Milone (8–4) || Ventura (10–8)  || — || 36,825 || 82–55
|- bgcolor="bbffbb"
| 139 || September 8 || Twins || 4–2 || Vólquez (13–7) || Gibson (9–10) || — || 31,834 || 83–55
|- bgcolor="ffbbbb"
| 140 || September 9 || Twins || 2–3 (12) || Boyer (3–4) || Morales (3–2) || Jepsen (12) || 32,286 || 83–56
|- bgcolor="ffbbbb"
| 141 || September 11 || @ Orioles || 8–14 || Givens (2–0) || Herrera (4–3) || — || 45,420 || 83–57
|- bgcolor="bbffbbb"
| 142 || September 12 || @ Orioles || 14–6 || Ventura (11–8) || Matusz (1–4) || — || 35,439 || 84–57
|- bgcolor="ffbbbb"
| 143 || September 13 || @ Orioles || 2–8 || Chen (9–7) || Cueto (9–12) || — || 22,496 || 84–58
|- bgcolor="ffbbbb"
| 144 || September 14 || @ Indians || 3–8 || Carrasco (13–10) || Vólquez (13–8) || — || 10,356 || 84–59
|- bgcolor="bbffbb"
| 145 || September 15 || @ Indians || 2–0 || Medlen (4–1) || Tomlin (5–2) || Holland (31) || 10,516 || 85–59
|- bgcolor="ffbbbb"
| 146 || September 16 || @ Indians || 1–5 || Salazar (13–8) || Duffy (7–8) || — || 11,103 || 85–60
|- bgcolor="bbffbb"
| 147 || September 17 || @ Indians || 8–4 || Ventura (12–8) || Kluber (8–14) || Holland (32) || 13,125 || 86–60
|- bgcolor="ffbbbb"
| 148 || September 18 || @ Tigers || 4–5 (12) || VerHagen (2–0) || Holland (3–2) || — || 32,926 || 86–61
|- bgcolor="ffbbbb"
| 149 || September 19 || @ Tigers || 5–6 (11) || Gorzelanny (2–2) || Almonte (0–1) || — || 36,007 || 86–62
|- bgcolor="bbffbb"
| 150 || September 20 || @ Tigers || 10–3 || Medlen (5–1) || Simón (13–10) || Duffy (1) || 32,788 || 87–62
|- bgcolor="ffbbbb"
| 151 || September 22 || Mariners || 2–11 || Iwakuma (9–4) || Guthrie (8–8) || — || 29,081 || 87–63
|- bgcolor="bbffbb"
| 152 || September 23 || Mariners || 4–3 (10) || Davis (8–1) || Rollins (0–2) || — || 28,756 || 88–63
|- bgcolor="bbffbb"
| 153 || September 24 || Mariners || 10–4 || Cueto (10–12) || Kensing (1–1) || — || 32,244 || 89–63
|- bgcolor="ffbbbb"
| 154 || September 25 || Indians || 0–6 || Carrasco (14–11) || Vólquez (13–9) || — || 37,049 || 89–64
|- bgcolor="ffbbbb"
| 155 || September 26 || Indians || 5–9 || Medlen (5–2) || McAllister (4–4) || — || 36,167 || 89–65
|- bgcolor="bbffbb"
| 156 || September 27 || Indians || 3–0 || Young (11–6) || Salazar (13–10) || Davis (14) || 36,339 || 90–65
|- bgcolor="ffbbbb"
| 157 || September 28 || @ Cubs || 0–1 (11) || Rodney (7–5) || Almonte (0–2) || — || 40,552 || 90–66
|- bgcolor="ffbbbb"
| 158 || September 29 || @ White Sox || 2–4 || Samardzija (11–13) || Cueto (10–13) || Robertson (33) || 13,024 || 90–67
|- bgcolor="bbffbb"
| 159 || September 30 || @ White Sox || 5–3 || Morales (4–2) || Robertson (6–5) || Davis (15) || 12,818 || 91–67
|-

|- bgcolor="bbffbb"
| 160 || October 1 || @ White Sox || 6–4 || Medlen (6–2) || Danks (7–15) || Madson (3) || 12,825 || 92–67
|- bgcolor="bbffbb"
| 160 || October 2 || @ Twins || 3–1 || Coleman (1–0) || Santana (7–5) || Davis (16) || 31,534 || 93–67
|- bgcolor="bbffbb"
| 161 || October 3 || @ Twins || 5–1 || Ventura (13–8) || Boyer (3–6) || Davis (17) || 30,181 || 94–67
|- bgcolor="bbffbb"
| 162 || October 4 || @ Twins || 6–1 || Cueto (11–13) || Nolasco (5–2) || — || 24,108 || 95–67
|-

|- style="text-align:center;"
| Legend:       = Win       = Loss       = PostponementBold = Royals team member

Post-season

American League Division Series vs. Houston Astros 
The Houston Astros defeated the New York Yankees 3–0 in the 2015 American League Wild Card Game on Tuesday, October 6, earning them the right to play the Royals in the ALDS.

Game 1, October 8 
6:37 p.m. CDT at Kauffman Stadium in Kansas City, Missouri

One season after the Royals blazed through the 2014 ALDS and ALCS with sweeps, they fell to the Astros in their first postseason game of 2015, struggling to manufacture offense against Houston's Collin McHugh.  McHugh pitched six innings, holding the Royals to two runs and six hits.  The only Kansas City hitter to produce runs was Kendrys Morales, who cracked a pair of solo shots off McHugh in the second and fourth innings.  Morales had been the leadoff batter in the second; and in the fourth, the Royals could not put any men on base prior to Morales' second blast.  Kansas City's own starter, Yordano Ventura, seemed dazed early, giving up a walk and two hits to the Astros before he recorded the game's first out.  Houston then utilized sacrifice ground outs to bring home their first two runs of the game.  After surrendering a third run in the second inning, Ventura, having amassed only two innings of work and having struck out two, was replaced by Chris Young following a rain delay.  Young would go on to pitch four innings, the most of any Royal in the game.  Young put three zeroes on the board against Houston, but the Astros did strike once against him in the fifth, taking a 4–2 lead, as George Springer hit a solo home run to left field.  Houston's offense was nightcapped, appropriately, by a Colby Rasmus home run in the eighth; Rasmus had crushed a home run in the wild card game against New York to help the Astros earn a series against the Royals.  A loyal crowd in Kansas City tried to unnerve Houston closer Luke Gregerson in the ninth, especially after he hit Mike Moustakas with a pitch, but the final inning was otherwise uneventful, and the Astros sealed their 5–2 Game 1 victory over the Royals with relative ease.

Game 2, October 9 
2:47 p.m. CDT at Kauffman Stadium in Kansas City, Missouri

The Royals struck back in Game 2 to force a Game 4 in Houston, but it wasn't easy.  They again fell behind early as starter Johnny Cueto's struggles continued, Colby Rasmus doubling to bring in George Springer to give the Astros a 1–0 lead.  They would pad it in the second with two more runs off of Cueto, courtesy of a Springer line drive that brought home Chris Carter and Jason Castro, who had previously reached on a single and walk, respectively.

The Royals' offense rolled out of bed in the bottom of the second, with Salvador Pérez cracking a solo shot off of Houston's Scott Kazmir.  The Astros negated the effect of the Kansas City run in the top of the third as Rasmus homered for his third consecutive postseason game.  Kansas City remained resilient, however, with Alex Ríos doubling, Alcides Escobar singling on an overturned video-review call, and Ben Zobrist hitting a sacrifice ground out to bring Rios home.  At the end of the third inning, Houston led 4–2.  The Astros' scoring for the evening was over.

Neither team posted a run in the fourth or fifth innings, but the Royals hung their first two-spot in the bottom of the sixth.  After Lorenzo Cain doubled with one out, Kazmir was relieved by Óliver Pérez, who was shaky, allowing Eric Hosmer to score Cain. Kendrys Morales then singled and Mike Moustakas drew a walk. Josh Fields entered the game as Houston's third pitcher of the inning.  Fields walked yet another batter, bringing home the tying run in Hosmer, before ending the inning with two consecutive strikeouts.  Kansas City then took the lead in the bottom of the seventh, Escobar tripling and then being brought home by a Zobrist single. Ryan Madson was effective in relief for Kansas City in the eighth.  In the ninth, closer Wade Davis struck out Jed Lowrie, but then walked Preston Tucker. Carlos Gomez entered the game as a pinch-runner for Tucker. However, in their second challenge victory of the night, a Davis pickoff throw in which Gomez was originally ruled to be safe was overturned, retiring him for the second out of the inning. José Altuve then grounded out to end the game.

Game 3, October 11 
3:07 p.m. CDT at Minute Maid Park in Houston, Texas

The Kansas City Royals' Edinson Vólquez pitched valiantly, only allowing three of four runs from Houston's power-hitting lineup, but the Astros surged ahead 2–1 in the series anyway on the back of another strong pitching performance from their own starter, Dallas Keuchel, who struck out seven Royal batters and surrendered only a solo home run, a fourth inning blast off the bat of Lorenzo Cain.  Kansas City's only other run would come off of Houston relief pitching.  Houston's own offense struck in the bottom of the fifth inning, the Astros posting a two-run frame to negate the Cain blast.  Volquez, after striking out Carlos Gómez, walked Luis Valbuena, who was then moved over to third base by virtue of a Chris Carter double. Jason Castro then manufactured a ground ball single to score both Carter and Gomez.  The Astros then hung two more runs on the Royals, one each in the sixth and seventh. Alex Gordon homered for Kansas City in the top of the ninth, a solo shot off closer Luke Gregerson, but Gregerson then gathered himself and retired the remainder of the Royals' ninth without suffering any further damage, sealing the Houston victory.  The Royals now must win in Game 4 on the road to extend the series, and their season, to a Game 5.

Game 4, October 12

The Royals' string of clutch hits in the top of the eighth against a frazzled Houston bullpen restored life to a team that had been pushed to the brink of elimination by Astro starter Lance McCullers.  Reliever Ryan Madson was credited with the win for Kansas City in spite of giving up back to back home runs in the bottom of the seventh that had a raucous Minute Maid Park crowd thinking that an Astros seat in the ALCS was all but assured.  Houston's Will Harris was charged with four earned runs and Tony Sipp with one during Kansas City's eighth inning comeback.

Game 5, October 14

American League Championship Series vs. Toronto Blue Jays 
The Blue Jays had defeated the Texas Rangers three games to two in the 2015 American League Division Series.

Game 1, October 16

Game 2, October 17

This game marked the fourth time the Royals had rallied back from a multi-run deficit to win in this post-season.	
With the Royals trailing 3–0, Ben Zobrist led off the seventh inning with a pop-up to shallow right field. Second baseman Ryan Goins had a lead on the ball and waved off charging right fielder José Bautista only to duck out of the way at the last moment, allowing the ball to drop for what was ruled a single. The Royals went on to score five runs in the inning. This marked David Price's seventh consecutive playoff loss, tying him with Randy Johnson for the record.

Game 3, October 19

Game 4, October 20

This game marked the first time in postseason history that a position player was brought in to pitch. Cliff Pennington of the Blue Jays was brought in during the 9th inning as Toronto's bullpen became increasingly thin after the Royals scoring refused to cease after numerous pitching changes. The players in the dugout and the few remaining fans left found this very amusing. Pennington gave up two unearned runs before retiring the side.

Game 5, October 21

Game 6, October 23

World Series vs. New York Mets 
The New York Mets had defeated the Chicago Cubs four games to zero in the 2015 National League Championship Series.

Game 1, October 27

The ceremonial first pitch was thrown out by George Brett. Matt Harvey started Game 1 for the Mets, while Edinson Vólquez started for the Royals. Volquez's father died earlier in the day. He was not aware of his father's death until after he left the game.

On the first pitch thrown by Harvey, Alcides Escobar hit an inside-the-park home run, the first in a World Series game since Mule Haas in the 1929 World Series (and the first hit by a leadoff batter since Patsy Dougherty did it for the Boston Americans (now Red Sox) in ). In the fourth inning, Daniel Murphy recorded the Mets' first hit, and later scored their first run on a hit by Travis d'Arnaud. Curtis Granderson hit a home run in the fifth inning to give the Mets a 2–1 lead. Eric Hosmer reduced the lead to 3–2 with a sacrifice fly, and set a new Royals' postseason run batted in (RBI) record in the process. A single by Mike Moustakas tied the game at three, but in the top of the eighth, Wilmer Flores reached on an fielding error by Hosmer, allowing Juan Lagares to score the go-ahead run and give the Mets a 4–3 lead. Alex Gordon tied the game for the Royals with a home run in the bottom of the ninth inning, as Jeurys Familia blew his first save in six opportunities this postseason.

In the bottom of the 14th inning, Escobar reached first base on a throwing error by David Wright, and Bartolo Colón gave up a base hit to Ben Zobrist, allowing Escobar to reach third base. Hosmer hit a sacrifice fly to Granderson in right field to drive in the winning run. The game ended at 1:18 AM EDT, lasting five hours and nine minutes. The loss made Colón the oldest man ever to lose a World Series game.

Game 2, October 28

In Game 2, Jacob deGrom started for the Mets, and Johnny Cueto started for the Royals. The Mets scored the first run of the game with a Lucas Duda single that scored Murphy in the fourth inning. In the fifth inning, the Royals scored four runs on RBI singles by Alcides Escobar, Eric Hosmer, and Mike Moustakas. The Royals scored three more runs in the eighth inning.	

Game 3, October 30

At Citi Field, Game 3 was started by Yordano Ventura of the Royals and Noah Syndergaard of the Mets. The ceremonial 1st pitch was thrown by Mike Piazza. With no designated hitter (DH) in NL parks, the Mets started Michael Conforto, their DH for Game 2, in the outfield instead of Juan Lagares, and the Royals did not start Kendrys Morales, their regular DH. Ben Zobrist scored the Royals' first run in the first inning on a force play. The first pitch thrown by Syndergaard was over the head of Royals shortstop Alcides Escobar causing the Royals to complain. In the bottom of the first inning, David Wright responded with a two-run home run that also scored Curtis Granderson. For the Royals, Alex Ríos drove Salvador Pérez home in the second inning, and scored on a passed ball by Travis d'Arnaud, giving the Royals a 3–2 lead. Granderson hit a two-run home run in the third inning, and the Mets took a 4–3 lead. The Mets added a run in the fourth inning on an RBI single by Conforto, and four more in the sixth inning. The Royals made a few uncharacteristic mistakes in this game, the first coming in the fourth inning when pitcher Yordano Ventura forgot to cover the base on a ground ball to the first baseman, and the second in the sixth inning when Royals pitcher Franklin Morales triple-clutched Granderson's ground ball, allowing all runners to be safe, which led to a 2-run single by David Wright.

In the 5th inning, Royals player Raúl Adalberto Mondesí made his Major League Baseball debut, pinch hitting for Danny Duffy, becoming the first player to ever make their MLB debut in the World Series.

Game 4, October 31

The ceremonial first pitch was thrown out by country singer Tim McGraw, son of the late Mets relief pitcher Tug McGraw. The starting pitchers for Game 4 are Chris Young of the Royals and Steven Matz of the Mets. Conforto scored the game's first run with a home run in the third inning, and Wilmer Flores scored later in the inning. Conforto hit another home run in the fifth inning, becoming the first rookie to hit two home runs in a World Series game since Andruw Jones in the 1996 World Series. In the sixth inning, Zobrist hit his eighth double of the postseason, tying a postseason record previously set by Albert Pujols and David Freese of the 2011 St. Louis Cardinals. The Royals took the lead in the eighth inning off of Tyler Clippard and Familia, who had his second blown save of the series.

Game 5, November 1

Volquez returned to the Dominican Republic for his father's funeral the day after Game 1, but returned to the Royals in time to start Game 5. Harvey started for the Mets. Tony Bennett performed America the Beautiful, and the first pitch was thrown by Cleon Jones, Mookie Wilson, and Darryl Strawberry.

Granderson led off the first inning with a home run for the Mets, and scored the Mets' second run in the sixth inning. Harvey pitched eight shutout innings for the Mets. It appeared manager Terry Collins would go to Familia, his closer, for the ninth inning, but Harvey convinced Collins to keep him in the game. He then gave up a leadoff walk to Lorenzo Cain in the ninth inning, and the Royals got a run when Hosmer drove Cain in with a double, prompting Collins to go get Familia. Hosmer scored the tying run, and Familia blew his third save of the postseason and series; his eight save opportunities tied the postseason record set in 2002 by Robb Nen.

In the top of the twelfth inning, with Addison Reed pitching for the Mets, Pérez hit a single for the Royals. Pinch running for Pérez, Jarrod Dyson stole a base and scored on a single by pinch hitter Christian Colón. After Paulo Orlando, who had substituted into the game earlier, reached base on an error by Daniel Murphy, Alcides Escobar hit a double to score Colón. Ben Zobrist was intentionally walked to load the bases, and Cain drove home three more runs with a double off Bartolo Colón. Davis pitched a shutout inning for the Royals to complete the series and win the championship; he struck out Wilmer Flores looking to end the game, series, and baseball season.

This marked the second consecutive year (and the fourth time in the last six years) that the home team did not win the World Series, thus the trophy presentation was done in the locker room.

Postseason game log

|- text-align:center; bgcolor="ffbbbb"
| 1 || October 8 || Astros || 2–5 || McHugh (1–0) || Ventura (0–1) || Gregerson (1) || 40,146 || 0–1
|- text-align:center; bgcolor="bbffbb"
| 2 || October 9 || Astros || 5–4 || Herrera (1–0)  || Harris (0–1)  || Davis (1)  || 40,008 || 1–1
|- text-align:center; bgcolor="ffbbbb"
| 3 || October 11 || @ Astros || 2–4 || Keuchel (1–0) || Vólquez (0–1) || Gregerson (2) || 42,674 || 1–2
|- text-align:center; bgcolor="bbffbb"
| 4 || October 12 || @ Astros || 9–6 || Madson (1–0) || Sipp (0–1)  || Davis (2) || 42,387 || 2–2
|- text-align:center; bgcolor="bbffbb"
| 5 || October 14 || Astros || 7–2 || Cueto (1–0)|| McHugh (1–1)|| Davis (3) || 40,566 || 3–2
|-

|- text-align:center; bgcolor="bbffbb"
| 1 || October 16 || Blue Jays || 5–0 || Vólquez (1–0) || Estrada (0–1) ||  || 39,753 || 1–0
|- text-align:center; bgcolor="bbffbb"
| 2 || October 17 || Blue Jays || 6–3 || Duffy (1–0) || Price (0–1) || Davis (1) || 40,357 || 2–0
|- text-align:center; bgcolor="ffbbbb"
| 3 || October 19 || @ Blue Jays || 8–11 || Stroman (1–0) || Cueto (0–1) ||  || 49,751 || 2–1
|- text-align:center; bgcolor="bbffbb"
| 4 || October 20 || @ Blue Jays || 14–2 || Hochevar (1–0) || Dickey (0–1) || || 49,501 || 3–1
|- text-align:center; bgcolor="ffbbbb"
| 5 || October 21 || @ Blue Jays || 1–7 || Estrada (1-1) || Volquez (1-1) ||  || 49,325 || 3–2
|- text-align:center; bgcolor="bbffbb"
| 6 || October 23 || Blue Jays || 4–3 || Davis (1–0)  || Osuna (0–1)  ||  || 40,494 || 4–2
|-

|- text-align:center; bgcolor="bbffbb"
| 1 || October 27 || Mets || 5–4 (14) || Young (1-0)  || Colón (0-1) ||  || 40,320  || 1–0
|- text-align:center; bgcolor="bbffbb"
| 2 || October 28 || Mets || 7–1 || Cueto (1–0) || deGrom (0–1) ||  || 40,410 || 2–0
|- text-align:center; bgcolor="ffbbbb"
| 3 || October 30 || @ Mets || 3–9 || Syndergaard (1–0) || Ventura (0–1) ||  || 44,781 || 2–1
|- text-align:center; bgcolor="bbffbb"
| 4 || October 31 || @ Mets || 5–3 || Madson (1–0)  || Clippard (0–1) || Davis (1) || 44,815 || 3–1
|- text-align:center; bgcolor="bbffbb"
| 5 || November 1 || @ Mets || 7–2 (12) || Hochevar (1–0)  || Reed (0–1)  ||  || 44,859 || 4–1
|-

Postseason rosters

| style="text-align:left" |
Pitchers: 17 Wade Davis 30 Yordano Ventura 32 Chris Young 36 Edinson Vólquez 39 Kris Medlen 40 Kelvin Herrera 41 Danny Duffy 44 Luke Hochevar 45 Franklin Morales 46 Ryan Madson 47 Johnny Cueto
Catchers: 9 Drew Butera 13 Salvador Pérez 
Infielders: 2 Alcides Escobar 8 Mike Moustakas 18 Ben Zobrist 24 Christian Colón 35 Eric Hosmer
Outfielders: 0 Terrance Gore 1 Jarrod Dyson 4 Alex Gordon 6 Lorenzo Cain 15 Alex Ríos 16 Paulo Orlando
Designated hitters: 25 Kendrys Morales
|- valign="top"

| style="text-align:left" |
Pitchers: 17 Wade Davis 30 Yordano Ventura 32 Chris Young 36 Edinson Vólquez 39 Kris Medlen 40 Kelvin Herrera 41 Danny Duffy 44 Luke Hochevar 45 Franklin Morales 46 Ryan Madson 47 Johnny Cueto
Catchers: 9 Drew Butera 13 Salvador Pérez 
Infielders: 2 Alcides Escobar 8 Mike Moustakas 18 Ben Zobrist 24 Christian Colón 35 Eric Hosmer
Outfielders: 0 Terrance Gore 1 Jarrod Dyson 4 Alex Gordon 6 Lorenzo Cain 15 Alex Ríos 16 Paulo Orlando
Designated hitters: 25 Kendrys Morales 
|- valign="top"

| style="text-align:left" |
Pitchers: 17 Wade Davis 30 Yordano Ventura 32 Chris Young 36 Edinson Vólquez 39 Kris Medlen 40 Kelvin Herrera 41 Danny Duffy 44 Luke Hochevar 45 Franklin Morales 46 Ryan Madson 47 Johnny Cueto
Catchers: 9 Drew Butera 13 Salvador Pérez
Infielders: 2 Alcides Escobar 8 Mike Moustakas 18 Ben Zobrist 24 Christian Colón 27 Raúl Mondesí 35 Eric Hosmer
Outfielders: 1 Jarrod Dyson 4 Alex Gordon 6 Lorenzo Cain 15 Alex Ríos 16 Paulo Orlando
Designated hitters: 25 Kendrys Morales
|- valign="top"

Roster

Statistics

Batting
Note: G = Games played; AB = At bats; R = Runs scored; H = Hits; 2B = Doubles; 3B = Triples; HR = Home runs; RBI = Runs batted in; BB = Base on balls; SO = Strikeouts; AVG = Batting average; SB = Stolen bases

Pitching
Note: W = Wins; L = Losses; ERA = Earned run average; G = Games pitched; GS = Games started; SV = Saves; IP = Innings pitched; H = Hits allowed; R = Runs allowed; ER = Earned runs allowed; HR = Home runs allowed; BB = Walks allowed; K = Strikeouts

Farm system

Outfielder José Martínez, while playing for Omaha, broke the Pacific Coast League (PCL) batting record with a .384 average and led the league in on-base percentage (OBP, .461) and was an All-Star.

References

External links

2015 Kansas City Royals Official Site 
2015 Kansas City Royals at Baseball Reference

Kansas City Royals
Kansas City Royals seasons
Kansas City Royals
American League Central champion seasons
American League champion seasons
World Series champion seasons